Elizabeth Banks (born Elizabeth Irene Mitchell; February 10, 1974) is an American actress and filmmaker. She is known for playing Effie Trinket in The Hunger Games film series (2012–2015) and Gail Abernathy-McKadden in the Pitch Perfect film series (2012–2017). She made her directorial film debut with Pitch Perfect 2 (2015), whose $69 million opening-weekend gross set a record for a first-time director. She went on to direct, write, produce, and star in the action comedy film Charlie's Angels (2019). She also directed and produced the horror comedy film Cocaine Bear (2023). Banks founded the film and television production company Brownstone Productions in October 2002, with her husband Max Handelman.

Banks made her film debut in the low-budget independent film Surrender Dorothy (1998). She has appeared in the films Wet Hot American Summer (2001), Sam Raimi's Spider-Man trilogy (2002–2007), Seabiscuit (2003), The 40-Year-Old Virgin (2005), Slither (2006), Invincible (2006), Zack and Miri Make a Porno (2008), Role Models (2008), The Next Three Days (2010), Man on a Ledge (2012), What to Expect When You're Expecting (2012), Movie 43 (2013), The Lego Movie (2014) and its 2019 sequel, Love & Mercy (2014), Walk of Shame (2014), Magic Mike XXL (2015), Power Rangers (2017), and Brightburn (2019).

On television, Banks had a recurring role as Avery Jessup on the NBC sitcom 30 Rock, which earned her two Primetime Emmy Award nominations. She also had recurring roles on the comedy series Scrubs and Modern Family, the latter of which earned her a third Primetime Emmy Award nomination. She starred in the Netflix miniseries Wet Hot American Summer: First Day of Camp (2015) and Wet Hot American Summer: Ten Years Later (2017). Since 2019, Banks has hosted the ABC revival of the 1980s game show Press Your Luck.

Early life
Banks was born and raised in Pittsfield, Massachusetts, the eldest of four children of Ann (née Wallace) and Mark P. Mitchell. Her father, a Vietnam War veteran, was a factory worker for General Electric and her mother worked in a bank. She described her family as "very meat-and-potatoes, old-school Irish Catholic." Growing up, she played baseball and rode horses. She was in Little League when she broke her leg sliding into third base. She then tried out for the school play, which was her start in acting.

She graduated from Pittsfield High School in 1992, and is a member of the Massachusetts Junior Classical League. She attended the University of Pennsylvania, where she was a member of the Delta Delta Delta Sorority and was elected to the Friars Senior Society. She graduated magna cum laude in 1996 with a major in communications and a minor in theater arts. In 1998, she completed schooling at the American Conservatory Theater in San Francisco, California, where she earned an MFA degree.

Career

1998–2005: Early career and breakthrough

Banks changed her name upon joining the Screen Actors Guild, as actress Elizabeth Mitchell was already registered in the union under that name.

After auditioning in New York, she was offered a role on the soap opera Santa Barbara. Taking the role would have required her to quit her education at the American Conservatory Theater, and as she had taken out student loans to complete her degree, she declined the offer. She made her acting debut in the 1998 independent film Surrender Dorothy as Elizabeth Casey, and appeared in various films over the next seven years, including Wet Hot American Summer (2001), Swept Away (2002) and Seabiscuit (2003).  Her most noticeable role up to that point was Betty Brant in Sam Raimi's Spider-Man trilogy (2002-2007).

In 2002, Banks set up her own production company, Brownstone Productions, with her future husband, Max Handelman.

Banks gained more prominent widespread exposure with her role in the 2005 comedy film The 40-Year-Old Virgin. In August 2005, at the Williamstown Theatre Festival, she starred in William Inge's Bus Stop as Cherie, the sexy blonde aspiring nightclub singer. Jeffrey Borak wrote that Banks' portrayal was acted "with poise, clarity and a shrewd feel for Cherie's complexities. Her performance is all of a piece and in harmony, stylistically, with the performances around her." In 2005, she appeared on the series Stella, and in May 2006, she had a role in the season five finale of the NBC sitcom Scrubs as Dr. Kim Briggs, the love interest of J.D. (Zach Braff). Banks appeared throughout seasons six, seven, and eight as a recurring guest star.

2006–2014: Further success and recognition
In 2006, Banks appeared in the American football drama film Invincible, in which she played Mark Wahlberg's love interest. Later, she and co-star Wahlberg were nominated for the "Best Kiss" award at the MTV Movie Awards. That same year, she landed the starring role in the comedy-horror film Slither.

In 2007, Banks played the female lead in the comedy film Meet Bill, alongside Aaron Eckhart and Jessica Alba. That same year, she had a small role as Santa's little helper, Charlyne, in the Christmas comedy film Fred Claus, co-starring Vince Vaughn and Paul Giamatti. In 2008, she played the ex-wife and mother of the daughter of Ryan Reynolds lead in the comedy film Definitely, Maybe, alongside Isla Fisher and Ryan Reynolds, starred with Seth Rogen as the eponymous female lead in the Kevin Smith comedy Zack and Miri Make a Porno, and played United States First Lady Laura Bush in W., Oliver Stone's biopic of George W. Bush.

In 2009, Banks appeared in the horror film The Uninvited, a remake of the South Korean film A Tale of Two Sisters. The film was about an intrusive stepmother who makes life miserable for the teen daughters of her new husband. Banks based her character, Rachel, on Rebecca De Mornay's character in The Hand That Rocks the Cradle. "It was very important to me that every line reading I gave could be interpreted two ways," says Banks of her role, "So that when you go back through the movie you can see that".

Banks is a frequent co-star of actor Paul Rudd, the two having appeared in five films together to date (Wet Hot American Summer, The Baxter, The 40-Year-Old Virgin, Role Models, and Our Idiot Brother). She is also a frequent co-star of actor Tobey Maguire, the two having also appeared in five films together (Spider-Man, Seabiscuit, Spider-Man 2, Spider-Man 3, and The Details).

Banks was cast as a love interest for Jack Donaghy (Alec Baldwin) in the fourth season of the Emmy Award-winning sitcom 30 Rock. Intended to appear in four episodes in 2010, Banks went on to become a recurring character with 13 appearances by the end of the fifth season, including her marriage in the episode "Mrs. Donaghy". Her performance in season five earned her a nomination for Primetime Emmy Award for Outstanding Guest Actress in a Comedy Series for the 63rd Primetime Emmy Awards.

In 2012, Banks starred in the romantic comedy film What to Expect When You're Expecting and the action film Man on a Ledge. She also starred as Gail Abernathy-McKadden in the musical comedy film Pitch Perfect, which became a critical and commercial success. The next year she directed and starred in separate segments of Movie 43, a critically panned comedy anthology film.

Banks starred in the science fiction adventure film The Hunger Games (2012), playing Effie Trinket, a woman from "The Capitol" who escorts the District 12 tributes to the annual Hunger Games. She went on to reprise the role in the sequel films The Hunger Games: Catching Fire (2013), The Hunger Games: Mockingjay – Part 1 (2014), and The Hunger Games: Mockingjay – Part 2 (2015). Banks co-starred in the 2014 movie Every Secret Thing, playing Detective Nancy Porter investigating the disappearance of a young child with similarities to a case she had previously been involved with. The same year, she provided the voice of the Master Builder Wyldstyle in the Warner Bros. animated film The Lego Movie.

In 2014, Banks was recognized by Elle Magazine during The Women in Hollywood Awards, honoring women for their outstanding achievements in film, spanning all aspects of the motion picture industry, including acting, directing, and producing.

2015–present: Directorial debut

After producing and starring in the film Pitch Perfect, Banks directed its sequel, Pitch Perfect 2 (2015), making her feature directorial debut. She also co-produced and starred in both Pitch Perfect 2 and the next sequel, Pitch Perfect 3 (2017).

Banks portrayed Melinda Ledbetter Wilson, the wife of Brian Wilson, in the 2015 biopic Love & Mercy, which is based on the life of the musician and founding member of The Beach Boys, as portrayed by John Cusack.

In 2015, she was named as a member of the Jury for the Main Competition at the 2015 Venice Film Festival. The festival was chaired by Alfonso Cuarón. Also in 2015, Banks became a spokeswoman for Realtor.com in their series of television commercials. As of mid-February 2016, Banks became the commercial face of Old Navy. She also played space alien Rita Repulsa in the 2017 Power Rangers reboot film.

In 2018, Banks co-starred as Jenny in the comedy film The Happytime Murders, alongside Melissa McCarthy and Maya Rudolph. In 2019, she reprised her starring role as Lucy / Wyldstyle in the animated comedy film The Lego Movie 2: The Second Part. She then starred as Tori Breyer in the superhero horror film Brightburn.

On May 2, 2019, ABC announced Banks as the host of the summer 2019 revival of the game show Press Your Luck, which she also executive produces. Banks directed, produced, wrote, and starred as Bosley in the action comedy film Charlie's Angels, which was released in November 2019. In 2020, she starred as feminist Jill Ruckelshaus in the FX miniseries Mrs. America.

In November 2019, it was announced that Banks was set to star in, direct, and produce a new adaptation of The Invisible Woman (1940), based on her own original story pitch. Erin Cressida Wilson will write the script for the reboot of the female monster, while Max Handelman and Alison Small will serve as producer and executive producer, respectively.

In February 2020, Banks was allowed to choose a project by Universal Pictures from the roster of Universal Monsters, ultimately choosing The Invisible Woman. In June 2020, it was announced Banks would star as Ms. Frizzle in a live-action/animated hybrid of The Magic School Bus, for which she will also produce through her company Brownstone Productions.

In March 2021, it was announced that Banks would direct the upcoming thriller film Cocaine Bear, which she will produce alongside Max Handelman for Brownstone Productions, and Phil Lord and Christopher Miller. In May 2021, Peacock announced that Banks will direct and star in the upcoming television series Red Queen, based on the dystopian novel of the same name.

In January 2022, Banks was cast in the upcoming film The Beanie Bubble, co-directed by Kristin Gore and Damian Kulash.

In March 2023 it was announced that Banks would be voicing Pebbles Flintstone and executive produce the upcoming Fox animated prime-time series Bedrock which will be a reboot of the original series The Flintstones and will take place two decades after that series.

Personal life

Banks met her husband, Max Handelman, a sportswriter and producer from Portland, Oregon, on her first day of college on September 7, 1992. They were married in 2003 and have two sons, born via surrogacy.

Banks went through parts of conversion to Judaism, her husband's faith, and studied with rabbis. In 2013, speaking of her religion, she stated that she practices Judaism, though "I did not have my mikveh, so, technically, I'm not converted," but that she has "been essentially a Jew for like 15 years," adding "Frankly, because I'm already doing everything [practicing religious rituals], I feel like I'm as Jewish as I'm ever going to be."

Politics
Banks supports gun control and abortion rights.

Banks was a vocal supporter of Hillary Clinton's 2016 presidential campaign and was involved in a rendition of Rachel Platten's single "Fight Song" with other celebrities at the 2016 Democratic National Convention. She has stated she is a feminist. In September 2020, Banks urged her Instagram followers to contact VoteRiders to get information and assistance with voter ID. That same month, she used her social media presence to participate in the VoteRiders #IDCheck Challenge to help spread the word about voter ID requirements for the upcoming presidential election.

Filmography

Banks has more than 250 credits to her name within film, television, and video games.

Awards and nominations

References

External links

 
 
 
 
 
 Elizabeth Banks appearances on C-SPAN

 
1974 births
Living people
20th-century American actresses
21st-century American actresses
Actresses from Massachusetts
American film actresses
American game show hosts
American people of Irish descent
American television actresses
American voice actresses
American women film directors
American women film producers
American women podcasters
American podcasters
American Conservatory Theater alumni
Annenberg School for Communication at the University of Pennsylvania alumni
Comedy film directors
Converts to Judaism from Roman Catholicism
Film directors from Massachusetts
Film producers from Massachusetts
Jewish American actresses
Massachusetts Democrats
People from Pittsfield, Massachusetts
United Service Organizations entertainers